Gachi Rural District is a rural district (dehestan) in Gachi District, Malekshahi County, Ilam Province, Iran. At the 2006 census, its population (including Delgosha, which has since been promoted to city status and detached from the rural district) was 13,067, in 2,154 families; excluding Delgosha, the population (as of 2006) was 9,136, in 1,478 families.  The rural district has 15 villages.

References 

Rural Districts of Ilam Province
Malekshahi County